Nicholas Lechmere may refer to:

 Nicholas Lechmere (priest) (1700/1–1770), English Archdeacon of Winchester
 Sir Nicholas Lechmere (politician, died 1701) (1613–1701), English MP and judge
 Nicholas Lechmere, 1st Baron Lechmere (1675–1727), MP, Solicitor-General and Attorney General
 Nicholas Lechmere Charlton (1733–1807), MP for Worcester (called Nicholas Lechmere until 1784)